Parelioi is a former municipality on the island of Corfu, Ionian Islands, Greece. Since the 2019 local government reform it is part of the municipality Central Corfu and Diapontia Islands, of which it is a municipal unit. It is located on the central west coast of the island of Corfu. The seat of the municipality was the town of Kokkini (pop. 580). Its largest towns are Sinarádes (pop. 854), Áfra (839), Giannádes (565), Kokkíni, Kompítsi (733), and Pélekas (405).

Subdivisions
The municipal unit Parelioi is subdivided into the following communities (constituent villages in brackets):
Kokkini
Agios Ioannis (Agios Ioannis, Agia Triada, Kouramaditika, Vasilika)
Afra (Afra, Agios Vlasios, Kourkoulaiika)
Vatos
Giannades (Giannades, Ermones)
Kanakades
Kompitsi
Marmaro
Pelekas (Pelekas, Avramis, Agios Onoufrios, Glyfada, Kokkinogeia, Plakoto)
Sinarades (Sinarades, Aspai, Kontogialos)

Population

Tourism

The economy of Parelioi is mainly based on tourism. There are beaches in Agios Gordis, Glyfada, Kondogialos and Ermones. The Historic and Folklore Museum of Central Corfu is located in Sinarades. Aqualand, the third largest water park in Europe, is situated in Agios Ioannis.

References

External links
Parelioi on GTP Travel Pages

Populated places in Corfu (regional unit)